The Zenvo TS1 GT is a limited production sports car manufactured by Danish automobile manufacturer Zenvo Automotive. It was unveiled at the 2016 Geneva Motor Show. Though the TS1 GT shares a similar chassis and body with its predecessor, the ST1, its new powertrain and upgraded interior earn it a new model designation along with the 'grand tourer' qualification. The production of the car is planned to be limited at 5 units per year, an increase from the limited 15-car total production run of its predecessor.

Specifications

Engine 

The engine has mid-rear mounted position.

Transmission and suspension 

The TS1 GT is equipped with a 7-speed dual-clutch automatic with helical-cut dog gears. The transmission is paired with a Torsen limited-slip differential and the clutch consists of two  discs. The car uses double wishbone suspension coupled with adjustable shocks and composite anti-roll bars on the front and rear axles. A hydraulic lifting mechanism is able to raise the front axle by 50 mm for extra ground clearance.

Wheels 

The car uses Michelin Pilot Sport 4S or Pilot Sport Cup 2 tires with codes of 265/35 ZR 19 at the front and 345/30 ZR 20 at the rear.

Interior features 

The interior of the Zenvo TS1 GT features a dashboard and central console finished in carbon-fiber and Alcantara, along with carbon-fiber bucket seats for the driver and passenger. The infotainment system includes a dashboard display, central display, and an Alpine audio system with Bluetooth connectivity.

Performance 

The car has a claimed 0–100 km/h (62 mph) acceleration time of 3.0 seconds. These performance figures are very similar to those of its predecessor.

Variants

Zenvo TSR 

The Zenvo TSR is a track-only version of the TS1 GT. Launched alongside the TS1 GT at the 2016 Geneva Motor Show, the TSR shares most of its mechanical components with the road-legal car, including the same engine and body. 

A larger carbon-fibre front splitter and rear diffuser have also been fitted to improve airflow at higher speeds. The TSR's interior includes a full roll cage and 6 point harnesses, with the infotainment system of the TS1 GT having been removed to save weight.

Zenvo TSR-S 

The Zenvo TSR-S is a road-legal version of the track-focused Zenvo TSR. Unveiled at the 2018 Geneva Motor Show, the TSR-S features numerous upgrades and design changes compared to the previous TS1 models and sits in-between the road-going, grand touring TS1 GT and the race-focused, track only TSR.

On the exterior of the car, the TSR-S has been redesigned with a larger front grille and large integrated splitter and diffuser. The carbon-fiber wing on the rear of the car is able to rotate with two degrees of freedom, allowing for air braking and corner stabilization. The interior of the car is driver focused as the TSR as standard, however many features of the TS1 GT can be optioned into the car like a sound system and climate control.

The manufacturer claims that this performance increase allows the TSR-S to accelerate from 0–100 km/h (62 mph) in 2.8 seconds, and from 0–200 km/h (124 mph) in 6.8 seconds. The TSR-S maintains the  top speed of the TSR.

See also 

 List of production cars by power output

References

External links 

 Zenvo Automotive TS1 GT official website
 Zenvo Automotive TSR official website
 Zenvo Automotive TSR-S official website

Cars introduced in 2016
Rear mid-engine, rear-wheel-drive vehicles
Sports cars